Hydnellum scabrosum, also called bitter tooth or bitter hedgehog, is a species of tooth fungus in the family Bankeraceae.

Taxonomy
It was originally described by Swedish botanist Elias Fries as Hydnum scabrosum in 1836.  Finnish mycologist Petter Karsten moved it to the genus Sarcodon in 1881. This species remained as Sarcodon scabrosus until 2019, when a molecular analysis using nuclear DNA showed that this and 11 other species lay genetically within the genus Hydnellum, a genus of which harder woody flesh had previously been considered a distinguishing feature from soft-fleshed Sarcodon.

Within the genus it is most closely related to H. fennicum.

Description
It can be tinged with pink at the margins and darken with age. They are decurrent to the stem. The flesh is whitish and has a bitter taste, rendering the mushroom inedible. The flesh smells farinaceous or like watermelon when cut.

Distribution and habitat
It is found in association with hardwood forests across Eurasia to Japan, as well as North America.

Biochemistry
The species has been investigated for bioactive agents. In 2004, Tsunashi Kamo and colleagues isolated diterpenoids with experimental anti-inflammatory activity. Other diterpenoids were shown to stimulate nerve growth factor (NGF). Yet another agent, an alpha-pyrone, was shown to inhibit lettuce seedling growth.

Similar species
Sarcodon imbricatus is similar, but the scales do not become as prominent in age. Other similar species include S. fennicus, S. rimosus, S. subincarnatus, and S. underwoodii.

References

scabrosum
Fungi of Europe
Taxa named by Elias Magnus Fries
Fungi described in 1836